Euphausia is the largest genus of krill, and is placed in the family Euphausiidae. There are 31 species known in this genus, including Antarctic krill (Euphausia superba) and ice krill (Euphausia crystallorophias) from the Southern Ocean, and North Pacific krill (Euphausia pacifica) in the Pacific Ocean.

Euphausia americana Hansen, 1911
Euphausia brevis Hansen, 1905
Euphausia crystallorophias Holt & Tattersall, 1906
Euphausia diomedeae Ortmann, 1894
Euphausia distinguenda Hansen, 1908
Euphausia eximia Hansen, 1911
Euphausia fallax Hansen, 1916
Euphausia frigida Hansen, 1911
Euphausia gibba G. O. Sars, 1883
Euphausia gibboides Ortmann, 1893
Euphausia hanseni Zimmer, 1915
Euphausia hemigibba Hansen, 1910
Euphausia krohnii (Brandt, 1851)
Euphausia lamelligera Hansen, 1911
Euphausia longirostris Hansen, 1908
Euphausia lucens Hansen, 1905
Euphausia mucronata G. O. Sars, 1883
Euphausia mutica Hansen, 1905
Euphausia nana Brinton, 1962
Euphausia pacifica Hansen, 1911
Euphausia paragibba Hansen, 1910
Euphausia pseudogibba Ortmann, 1893
Euphausia recurva Hansen, 1905
Euphausia sanzoi Torelli, 1934
Euphausia sibogae Hansen, 1908
Euphausia similis G. O. Sars, 1885
Euphausia spinifera G. O. Sars, 1885
Euphausia superba Dana, 1850
Euphausia tenera Hansen, 1905
Euphausia triacantha Holt & Tattersall, 1906
Euphausia vallentini Stebbing, 1900

References

External links

Krill
Crustacean genera
Taxa named by James Dwight Dana